Darius Campbell Danesh (19 August 1980 – 11 August 2022) was a Scottish singer-songwriter, actor and film producer. He first came to prominence as Darius Danesh when he appeared in the first series of Popstars in 2001, and the 2002 inaugural series of the ITV talent contest Pop Idol.

Under the name Darius, he recorded two studio albums, Dive In (2002) and Live Twice (2004), with both reaching top 40 in the UK Albums Chart. His debut single, "Colourblind", reached No. 1 in the UK Singles Chart in 2002. His next singles, "Rushes" and "Incredible (What I Meant to Say)", reached the top ten in the UK in 2002 and 2003, respectively.

Campbell Danesh performed the role of Billy Flynn in the West End production of Chicago in two runs of the musical. He played the lead role of Sky Masterson in the Olivier Award-winning Guys and Dolls, and the originating role of Rhett Butler in Sir Trevor Nunn's theatrical adaptation of Gone with the Wind.

In 2010, he trained with tenor Rolando Villazón, won the ITV competition Popstar to Operastar and performed a duet with Villazón on The Impossible Dream. The UK's biggest operatic production was the occasion of his operatic début, at the O2 Arena with the Royal Philharmonic, in Carmen. At the age of 29, he assumed the lead role of Escamillo, Carmen's lover. The same year, he also starred in The History of the Big Bands tour, a show which takes the audience on a musical journey through the big band and swing era.

Early life
Campbell Danesh was born in Glasgow on 19 August 1980 to a Scottish mother, Avril Campbell, and an Iranian father, Booth Danesh; his family live in Bearsden. The eldest of three boys, his younger brothers are Aria (born 1983) and Cyrus (born 1995). He attended Bearsden Primary School and the Glasgow Academy, before going on to study English Literature and Philosophy at the University of Edinburgh.

Career

2001–2002: Popstars and Pop Idol
Campbell Danesh's professional career began with a non-singing role in the Scottish Opera's avant garde 1990s production of The Trojans. As a teenager, he then performed at Covent Garden Royal Opera House with the Scottish Opera in a production of Carmen.

As Darius Danesh, he first gained fame in 2001 after appearing on the British talent competition Popstars. A year later he was voted to the finals of the TV talent show, Pop Idol. He turned down Simon Cowell's record deal, then signed with producer Steve Lillywhite.

In an interview to Daily Record, he said that he had not decided to drop the Campbell from his name, and that all was decided for him and that he should go by the name Darius Danesh.

2002–2004: "Colourblind" and Dive In

The first single written by Campbell Danesh, "Colourblind", was released on 29 July 2002 and entered the UK singles chart at number 1, staying at the top of the charts for two weeks; it was certified silver. It became certified gold on 1 May 2020.

His debut album, Dive In, was certified platinum in the UK in 2004, charting at number 6 on the UK Albums Chart during the competitive pre-Christmas sales period. He subsequently had five UK top ten singles.

He wrote all 12 songs on the Dive In album, and produced one of the tracks, "Better Than That", whilst collaborating with a number of other producers, such as The Misfits and The Matrix on the other tracks. Steve Lillywhite was executive producer on the album. Campbell Danesh, then performing as Darius Danesh, supported Shakira on her world tour and went on to complete his own sell-out UK Dive In tour. 

The Dive In tour took place in April and May 2003. The fifteen dates scheduled for May expanded to twenty three dates on public demand.

2004–2008: Sink or Swim, Live Twice and  Chicago
His book Sink or Swim, about the perils of the music business, was a Sunday Times best seller. He contributed to the War Child charity album with Coldplay and Oasis. He also headlined in India with Alanis Morissette.

After receiving news that his father was diagnosed with terminal cancer, he wrote and dedicated his second studio album Live Twice to Dr Booth Danesh, who later made a miraculous recovery. In 2005, the album's title-track Live Twice became his fifth top ten single.

Campbell Danesh had two West End runs in Chicago during 2005–2006, and at 25, became the youngest actor to fill the role of Billy Flynn since the show first opened on Broadway in 1975.

In 2007, after seeing Ewan McGregor in the role, he played the lead in Michael Grandage's Olivier Award-winning production of Guys and Dolls, starring as Sky Masterson. Later that year, he reprised his role of Billy Flynn for the 10th anniversary charity performance of Chicago in London, to benefit the charities Breast Cancer Haven and Breast Health Institute.

In 2008, he returned to London's West End to play Rhett Butler in Sir Trevor Nunn's musical adaptation of Gone with the Wind.

2010–2015: Popstar to Operastar and From Here to Eternity the Musical 
In January and February 2010, Campbell Danesh won the UK's ITV1 talent show Popstar to Operastar, in which eight pop stars were trained to perform famous opera arias. He was mentored by tenor Rolando Villazón, with whom he went on to duet on the song "The Impossible Dream". In May 2010 he appeared as toreador Escamillo in Bizet's opera Carmen at The O2 Arena in London. At the age of 29, he assumed the lead role of Carmen's lover. The same year, he starred in  The History of the Big Bands tour, a show about the Big Band and Swing Era, featuring the songs of Frank Sinatra and the music of the key musicians of the big band era, including music from Harry James, Benny Goodman, Tommy Dorsey, Duke Ellington, Glenn Miller, Count Basie, Woody Herman and Buddy Rich.

On 1 July 2013, it was announced that Campbell Danesh would play the lead role of Warden in the show From Here to Eternity the Musical.

2015–2022: Funny Girl and final works
Campbell Danesh played Nick Arnstein in Funny Girl at the Savoy Theatre in the West End, following a transfer from the Menier Chocolate Factory in April 2016.

Weeks prior to his death in August 2022, Danesh was said to have been "excited" about an upcoming Pop Idol re-union, with it being rumoured that he was set to duet with both Will Young and Gareth Gates in a reunion special which would be hosted by Ant & Dec. Filming was due to commence at Criterion Theatre in London.

Other work

Television
In 2003, Campbell Danesh appeared as himself in an episode of the Channel 4 soap Hollyoaks, performing "Girl in the Moon" at a graduation ball. In 2009, he guest starred on the BBC show Hotel Babylon as Gennaro Fazio, an Italian magazine editor.

Charity
Campbell Danesh was an ambassador for The Prince's Trust, helping underprivileged youth. He designed a guitar for Guitar Aid. He worked with and supported the Lymphoma Association and Cancer Research UK, in addition to other cancer charities.

Personal life
In 2010, he was seriously injured in a car crash in Spain, which left him with chronic neck pain. He declined an operation because there was a risk it would affect his vocal cords.

Campbell Danesh married Canadian actress Natasha Henstridge in February 2011. They filed for divorce in July 2013. The divorce was finalised in February 2018.

Death
Campbell Danesh was found unresponsive on 11 August 2022 (8 days before his 42nd birthday) in his apartment in Rochester, Minnesota, and he was pronounced dead later that day. His family reported there were no suspicious circumstances or signs of intent surrounding his death.

Tributes were paid by close friend Gerard Butler and others who had worked closely with Danesh, including Simon Cowell, Gareth Gates, Will Young and Ant & Dec. Eight days after his death, his debut single "Colourblind" charted at number two on both the UK Official Singles Download and Sales charts.

A private funeral was held for Campbell Danesh on 25 August 2022 at a church in the Glasgow suburb of Bearsden, which was attended by family members and close friends, including Gerard Butler.

An autopsy report, released on 10 September 2022, concluded that Campbell Danesh died from inhalation of chloroethane, which led to respiratory arrest. He used chloroethane in addition to physiotherapy to treat his neck pain. His death was ruled an accident. Campbell Danesh had suffered from chronic pain since a car accident in 2010 while on a holiday in Spain.

Discography

 Dive In (2002)
 Live Twice (2004)

Theatre

Books

References

External links

 
 
 Guitar Aid – The Darius Guitar
 
 Darius-Campbell-Danesh.com – Darius Remembrance Website 

 
1980 births
2022 deaths
21st-century Scottish male singers
19 Recordings artists
Accidental deaths in Minnesota
Alumni of the University of Edinburgh
BT Digital Music Awards winners
Deaths from asphyxiation
Mercury Records artists
Musicians from East Dunbartonshire
Musicians from Glasgow
People educated at Varndean College
People educated at the Glasgow Academy
People from Bearsden
Pop Idol contestants
Popstar to Operastar contestants
Scottish expatriates in the United States
Scottish male musical theatre actors
Scottish operatic baritones
Scottish people of Iranian descent
Scottish pop singers
Scottish singer-songwriters
Scottish songwriters
Singing talent show winners